Kellicottia is a genus of brachionid rotifer.

The genus was described in 1938 by Elbert Halvor Ahlstrom.

It has cosmopolitan distribution.

Species:
 Kellicottia bostoniensis
 Kellicottia longispina

References

Rotifer genera
Brachionidae